The Concierto serenata for harp and orchestra was composed in 1952 by Joaquín Rodrigo. It was written for Nicanor Zabaleta, who premiered the work in Madrid on November 9, 1956; Paul Kletzki conducted the Spanish National Orchestra. Zabaleta recorded it with the Berlin Radio Symphony Orchestra under Ernst Märzendorfer for Deutsche Grammophon three years later.

The concerto is in three movements; a typical performance lasts around 20 minutes. The first of the three movements represents a group of young musicians walking in the street; the third represents evening. The second is written in form of a canon.

The movements are:

Estudiantina (Allegro ma non troppo — Andante)
Intermezzo (Molto tranquillo)
Sarao (Allegro deciso)

References

See also
List of compositions for harp

Concertos by Joaquín Rodrigo
Rodrigo
1952 compositions